Otto Sesana (16 July 1943 - 25 January 2017) is an Argentine former footballer who competed in the 1964 Summer Olympics.

References

1943 births
2017 deaths
Association football defenders
Argentine footballers
Olympic footballers of Argentina
Footballers at the 1964 Summer Olympics
Rosario Central footballers